The Forçados River (originally Forcados) is a channel in the Niger Delta, in southern Nigeria. It is an important channel for small ships. The Forçados River splits from the Niger River at Toru-Abubou near Agbere Town in Sagbama Local Government Area of Bayelsa State, the same point as the Nun River.

People have been fishing on this river for years and then came to a dock on the Niger River to sell/store and use for personal consumption.

In the early years of the 20th century, Forçados was a destination port for steamers from England until the river silted up.

A large hoard of bronze artefacts (1 armlet, 7 bells, 3 bracelets, 1 knife and 3 manillas) from the Forçados River can be found in the British Museum's collection.

See also 
 Forcados
 Enclaves of Forcados and Badjibo

References

Rivers of Nigeria
Distributaries of the Niger River